The Long Green Line is an independent American feature length documentary film about the 2005 York Community High School Cross Country team, Elmhurst, Illinois. It is written, directed and co-produced by Matthew Arnold, with co-production and cinematography by Brady Hallongren. The film documents Coach Joe Newton's 50th year coaching, while the team is going for their 25th Illinois (IHSA) state title.

There are over 220 boys on the team, and during the film, two of the top seven runners are arrested, expelled from school, and expelled from the team for arson.

The film was released on August 18, 2008, and ran in theaters for six weeks.

Reception
 Three stars from Chicago Tribune
 Three stars - Chicago SunTimes: ""A healthy reminder of how sports can mold young men and women into better people. "

Awards
 Endurance Sports Award - Running Film of the Year
 Best Documentary  - Lake Forest Film Festival
 Best Documentary   - Naperville Film Festival
 Opening Film - Running Film Festival - U.S. Olympic Trials, Eugene Oregon
 Voted #10 Best Sports Film of all time - ESPNrise.com

References

External links
 

2008 films
Films set in Illinois
American sports documentary films
2008 documentary films
2000s English-language films
2000s American films